Windwalker is a 1989 video game published by Origin Systems.

Gameplay
Windwalker is a game in which a role-playing quest for wisdom and enlightenment is the sequel to Moebius: The Orb of Celestial Harmony.

Reception
Dennis Owens reviewed the game for Computer Gaming World, and stated that "Windwalker is an excellent game for fans of Moebius and for anyone looking for a combination action/role-playing game with an Oriental flair and a gentleness of spirit."

Reviews
Amiga User International - Mar, 1990
ASM (Aktueller Software Markt) - Feb, 1990
Info - Jan, 1990
Zzap! - Apr, 1990

References

External links
Review in Compute!
Review in Compute!'s Gazette

1989 video games
Action role-playing video games
Adventure games
Amiga games
Apple II games
Apple IIGS games
Atari ST games
Classic Mac OS games
Commodore 64 games
DOS games
Fantasy video games
Martial arts video games
Origin Systems games
Single-player video games
Video game sequels
Video games developed in the United States